The Bow Gamelan Ensemble was a group of musicians in Bow, London, England, who used elements of gamelan music. Formed in 1983 by Richard Wilson with  Paul Burwell and Anne Bean, the group disbanded in 1990. The ensemble created a theatrical experience, going beyond the normal definitions of music, and adapted their performances to the environment. They performed at Three Mills on the River Lea and many other novel venues.

Notes

External links
"Bow Gamelan performance - Margate Harbour, England 2004", YouTube.com.
"Paul Burwell, Anne Bean, Richard Wilson" [circa 2002], YouTube.com.
Burwell, Paul (1990)  from The Arts and Humanities Data Service.
"Review", The New York Times. 
, www.ArtistsInEastLondon.org.
 at the University of East London (March 2004).
.
.
'''' at the University of Bristol.

English gamelan ensembles
English new wave musical groups